The 1852 United States presidential election in Pennsylvania took place on November 2, 1852, as part of the 1852 United States presidential election. Voters chose 27 representatives, or electors to the Electoral College, who voted for President and Vice President.

Pennsylvania voted for the Democratic candidate, Franklin Pierce, over the Whig candidate, Winfield Scott. Pierce won Pennsylvania by a margin of 5.02%.

Results

Results by county

See also
 List of United States presidential elections in Pennsylvania

Notes

References

Pennsylvania
1852
1852 Pennsylvania elections